Viaggi di nozze is a 1995 Italian comedy film directed by Carlo Verdone.

Plot summary 
The film is divided into three stories that mingle during the performance.
In the first story, the timid Giovannino is married to Valeria and is about to leave in a cruise ship; but at the last moment Giovannino can not even leave, because he must look after his elderly father, abandoned by the caretaker, while Valeria must think of her sister, who pretends suicide because she wants money from her ex-boyfriend. Their honeymoon turns into a nightmare. 

In the second story, Raniero marries Fosca, his second wife. Immediately the honeymoon in Venice becomes tragic, because Raniero's weight is too much for Fosca, although he does not want it, the fact of having to face up to the "perfection" of his first wife, praised by Raniero. In the end, Fosca desperate suicides, just like his first wife. 

In the third story, the vulgar Ivano is married to Jessica, and their wedding journey becomes an uncompromising tour of discos. Soon the two realize that they have nothing in common to share because they know too much, and so they invent strategies to learn to "meet" again, without success, sinking into a state of depression and boredom.

Cast 
 Carlo Verdone - Raniero, Giovannino, Ivano
 Veronica Pivetti - Fosca 
 Claudia Gerini - Jessica Sessa
  - Valeriana Coli
  - Gloria Coli
  - Stefano 
  - Adelmo, Giovanni's father
 Maddalena Fellini: Piera, Giovanni's mother
 : Luciano

Reception
The film was number one at the Italian box office for three consecutive weeks and was the most popular Italian film in Italy for the year. It went on to a gross over $15 million.

References

External links 

1995 comedy films
1995 films
Italian comedy films
Films directed by Carlo Verdone
1990s Italian-language films
1990s Italian films